Michel Etcheverry (16 December 1919 – 30 March 1999) was a French actor. First a teacher, he was fired in 1941 for refusing to make the Maréchal children sing, here we come! . He began his career in the theater as a stage manager, then joined the troupe of Louis Jouvet .

He entered the Comédie-Française in 1961, was named member in 1964, honorary member in 1984. His repertoire includes many tragedies from the classical repertoire.

Career 
In 1951, he resumed in Le Diable et le bon Dieu by Sartre, the role held by Jean Vilar called to the direction of the TNP. After which, he performed L'Alouette by Anouilh, Sud by Julien Green, Pygmalion by G.-B. Shaw and above all The Diary of Anne Frank (1957/58) at the Montparnasse Theater and The Annunciation Made to Marie by Paul Claudel at the Work. It was then that he entered the Comédie-Française, already a seasoned actor whose exemplary diction, intelligence and bearing soon made him an indispensable part of the troupe. His austere physique, his deep voice and the rigor of his acting serve the tragic repertoire as well as contemporary drama. Racine's great confidants (Paulin,Berenice ; Narcisse, Britannicus), the noble fathers of Corneille (Don Diègue, Le Cid ; Auguste, Cinna ; the Old Horace, Horace ; Félix, Polyeucte and Sertorius), the Don Sallust of Ruy Blas are close to the characters, with a metaphysical dimension, of Claudel (The Hard Bread, The Hostage) and Montherlant (Malatesta, The Master of Santiago, The Cardinal of Spain), as well as those of ancient tragedy (Oedipus the King, Oedipus at Colone, Antigone in Brecht's version) . But he also plays Gide, Schiller, Shakespeare, Pirandello, Strindberg, Anouilh and T.-S. Eliot.

He directed André del Sarto and Bettine by Musset, Bajazet by Racine, L'Ecole des femmes by Molière, L'Apollon de Bellac by Giraudoux, Le Carrosse du Saint-Sacrement by Mérimée, Monsieur Le Trouhadec seized by the debauchery of Jules Romains, The False Confidences of Marivaux, A Caprice by Musset and The Barber of Seville by Beaumarchais.

On television, where he appeared a lot, he was notably the Marquis de Lantenac in Quatre-vingt-treize after Victor Hugo, Don Quixote, King Lear, Un Bourgeois de Calais... not to mention the dramas produced with the French comedy. In cinema, he has participated in many films. 

After the success of his interpretation of the title role of Sertorius by Pierre Corneille, he left the Comédie-Française and the theater in full glory.

Selected filmography

 Without Leaving an Address (1951) - Langlois, un futur papa 
 Nez de cuir (1952) - Un gentilhomme
 Matrimonial Agency (1952) - Marcel Sarlet, le fiancé de Viviane
 Ouvert contre X (1952) - Bertrand Moal
 La Jeune Folle (1952) - Le prêtre
 Les Conquérants solitaires (1952) - Le narrateur
 Crimson Curtain (1952) - Un acteur
 The Drunkard (1953) - L'avocat général
 Rasputin (1954) - Pourlchkevitch
 The Contessa's Secret (1954) - Pietri
 Madame du Barry (1954) - L'abbé de Beauvais
 Caroline and the Rebels (1955) - Le padre
 Tower of Lust (1955) - Enguerrand de Marigny
 Papa, maman, ma femme et moi (1955) - L'explorateur 
 The Lowest Crime (1955) - Le commissaire Bretrannet
 Les Aristocrates (1955) - Le notaire Crouelles
 The Affair of the Poisons (1955) - Le prédicateur
 More Whiskey for Callaghan (1955) - Prof. Ephraim Ponticollo
 Vous pigez? (1955) - (uncredited)
 Maid in Paris (1956) - Le commissaire des mineurs
 La Sorcière (1956) - L'ingénieur Camoin
 The Wages of Sin (1956) - Docteur Maroual
 The Whole Town Accuses (1956) - Le chef des gangsters
 It Happened in Aden (1956) - Pasteur Sanderman
 Honoré de Marseille (1956) - Bob
 Michel Strogoff (1956) - Général Krisloff
 Élisa (1957) - Le président
 Fumée blonde (1957) - Vladimir
 It's All Adam's Fault (1958) - Adam de Casaubon
 Le Désert de Pigalle (1958) - Le Radiologue
 Women's Prison (1958) - Le substitut
 Les Jeux dangereux (1958) - L'aveugle
 Drôles de phénomènes (1959)
 Un témoin dans la ville (1959) - Le juge d'instruction
 Bal de nuit (1959)
Julie the Redhead (1959) - Le notaire / Notary
 La Nuit des espions (1959) - L'officier allemand
 Ce soir on tue (1959) - Interpol Man #2
 Signé Arsène Lupin (1959) - Van Nelden, le collectionneur
 Eyes Without a Face (1960) - Le docteur Lherminier - médecin légiste / Forensic surgeon
 Recours en grâce (1960) - L'inspecteur-chef Pardelles
 Le Panier à crabes (1960) - Bertrand
 Tomorrow Is My Turn (1960) - Ludovic
 Vers l'extase (1960) - Père Bruno
 Three Faces of Sin (1961) - Commissaire Bertrand
 Famous Love Affairs (1961) - Gaspard Bernauer (segment "Agnès Bernauer")
 Les Nouveaux Aristocrates (1961) - Le recteur
 Le petit garçon de l'ascenseur (1962) - M. Maillet
 Mathias Sandorf (1963)
 Our Agent Tiger (1965) - (uncredited)
 Paris brûle-t-il? (1966) - Préfet Luizet
 La prisonnière (1968) - Le chirurgien
 The Milky Way (1969) - L'inquisiteur / The Inquisitor
 Aminata (1971) - (voice)
 Perceval le Gallois (1978) - Le Roi Pecheur
 I as in Icarus (1979) - Frédéric Heiniger, président de la cour de justice
 Tangos, the Exile of Gardel (1985) - San Martin
 L'écrivain public (1993) - Le professeur
 A French Woman (1995) - Charles

References

1919 births
1999 deaths
French male film actors
French theatre directors
People from Saint-Jean-de-Luz
Sociétaires of the Comédie-Française
French male stage actors
French male television actors
French National Academy of Dramatic Arts alumni
20th-century French male actors